Paralaubuca is a genus of cyprinid fishes found in Southeast Asia.  There are currently five described species in this genus.

Species
 Paralaubuca barroni (Fowler, 1934)
 Paralaubuca harmandi Sauvage, 1883
 Paralaubuca riveroi (Fowler, 1935)
 Paralaubuca stigmabrachium (Fowler, 1934)
 Paralaubuca typus Bleeker, 1864

References
 

 
Cyprinid fish of Asia
Cyprinidae genera
Taxa named by Pieter Bleeker